"Auf uns" is a song by German recording artist Andreas Bourani. It was written by Bourani along with Tom Olbrich and Julius Hartog for his second studio album Hey (2014), while production was helmed by Peter "Jem" Seifert. Released as the album's lead single in April 2014, the uptempo song marked Bourani's commercial breakthrough, when it reached the top of Austrian and German Singles Charts.

Formats and track listings

Charts

Weekly charts

Year-end charts

Decade-end charts

Certifications

References

2014 singles
2014 songs
Andreas Bourani songs
Number-one singles in Austria
Number-one singles in Germany
Universal Music Group singles
Songs written by Andreas Bourani